Between the Lines may refer to:

Film and television 
 Between the Lines (1977 film), a comedy directed by Joan Micklin Silver
 Between the Lines (2008 film), a documentary film
 Between the Lines (TV series), a 1990s British police drama
 Between the Lines (Australian TV series), a 2011 Australian game show

Music

Albums
 Between the Lines (Chemistry album)
 Between the Lines (Five Star album)
 Between the Lines (Janis Ian album)
 Between the Lines (Jason Donovan album)
 Between the Lines, 2019 album featuring Australian jazz trio Trichotomy with Danny Widdicombe as vocalist

Songs
 "Between the Lines" (Evermore song)
 "Between the Lines" (Stone Temple Pilots song)
 "Between the Lines", a song by Bloom 06 from Crash Test 02
 "Between the Lines", a song by Robyn from Honey
 "Between the Lines", a song by Sara Bareilles from Little Voice
 "Between the Lines", a song by Pink Fairies

Publications
 Between the Lines Books, a Canadian publisher
 Between the Lines (book), a 2011 novel by Jodi Picoult and Samantha Van Leer
 Between the Lines: Nine Things Baseball Taught Me About Life, a book by Orel Hershiser
 Between the Lines (newspaper), a Michigan LGBT newspaper

See also
 Between the Lies, a 2010 EP by Memphis May Fire
 Between the Lions, an American children's television series
 Read Between the Lines (disambiguation)